Madhya Pradesh State Highway 14 (MP SH 14) is a State Highway running from Katni city via Kumhari, Damoh, Garahkota, Sagar, Jarubakheda and Khurai till Bina town.
It is an important highway which connects important towns of Eastern Madhya Pradesh and Northern Madhya Pradesh.

See also
List of state highways in Madhya Pradesh

References

State Highways in Madhya Pradesh